Bishop of Clonmacnoise was the ordinary of the Roman Catholic episcopal see based at Clonmacnoise, County Offaly, Ireland. The bishops of Clonmacnoise (Old Irish: Cluain Moccu Nóis) appear in the records for the first time in the 9th century, although inferior in status to the Abbot of Clonmacnoise until the reformation of the Irish Church in the 12th century. After the Reformation, there were several parallel bishops placed by the Church of Ireland until the Diocese of Clonmacnoise was merged with Diocese of Meath to form the Diocese of Meath and Kildare in 1569. In the Roman Catholic Church, separate bishops continued longer. The diocese came under the administration of the Bishop of Ardagh between 1688 and 1725, before the provision of Stephen MacEgan in 1725. Although MacEgan was translated to Meath in 1729, he continued to administer Clonmacnoise separately until his death in 1756, after which the see was finally merged into the Roman Catholic Diocese of Ardagh and Clonmacnoise.

List of abbots of Clonmacnoise

List of bishops of Clonmacnoise

References

Annette Kehnel, Clonmacnois the Church and Lands of St. Ciarán:Change and Continuity in an Irish Monastic Foundation (6th- to 16th Century), 1995, Transaction Publishers, Rutgers – State University, USA. .

Religion in County Offaly
Clonmacnoise
Bishops of Kilmore or Elphin or of Ardagh
Bishops of Clonard or Kells or of Meath
Former Roman Catholic bishoprics in Ireland
Bishops of Ardagh or Clonmacnoise
Bishops of Clonmacnoise